Franco Ossola (23 August 1921 – 4 May 1949) was an Italian footballer who played as a forward.

With 85 goals, Ossola is the ninth highest scorer in the history of Torino behind Adolfo Baloncieri (100). He died on 4 May 1949 in the Superga air disaster when the Fiat G.212 which carried the celebrated Grande Torino team crashed into the retaining wall of the Basilica di Superga. The Stadio Franco Ossola in Varese is named after him.

His half-brother was Aldo Ossola, basketball player of the Ignis Varese in the 1970s.

Club career

Varese
Noticed as a young boy by the coach of Varese, Antonio Janni, he played for the senior team in Serie C. Initially, Janni did not allow him to play as he intended to sell him to Serie A club Torino, but was forced to send him on the pitch because of a starting player's injury. Janni contacted Ferruccio Novo, the president of Torino, who bought him for 55,000 lire.

Torino
At Torino he arrived at the age of 18 in 1939 and debuted in Serie A on 4 February 1940. Early in his career at Torino he suffered from the presence of Pietro Ferraris, who occupied the left wing. He eventually became a starter with the number 11 jersey, and played 181 games and scored 85 goals in Serie A, the 1944 Campionato Alta Italia and the National Division.

He was buried at the Cimitero Monumentale in Turin.

Career statistics

Club

Honours

Club
Torino
Serie A (5): 1942–43, 1945–46, 1946–47, 1947–48, 1948–49
Coppa Italia (1): 1942–43

Trivia
Franco Ossola was played by Gualtiero Burzi in the television miniseries The Grande Torino.

External links
 Dario Marchetti (eds.), Franco Ossola in Enciclopediadelcalcio.it, 2011.

1921 births
1949 deaths
Association football wingers
Footballers killed in the Superga air disaster
Italian footballers
Serie A players
S.S.D. Varese Calcio players
Torino F.C. players